Julia Valeryevna Vorobieva (born 25 June 1974) is a Russian-Azerbaijani retired figure skater who competed for the Soviet Union and Azerbaijan. She was a two-time Soviet national champion. She placed 7th at the 1991 European Championships and 10th at the 1991 World Championships for the Soviet Union, and 14th at the 1992 Winter Olympics for the Unified Team. In 1993, Vorobieva began competing for Azerbaijan. She appeared at the 1998 Winter Olympics, placing 16th. In September 2000, she began training and coaching in Odintsovo, near Moscow.

Programs

Results

For the Soviet Union, Unified Team, and Russia

For Azerbaijan

References

External links
 
 Julia Valeryevna Vorobieva (in Russian)

Navigation

Azerbaijani female single skaters
Russian female single skaters
Soviet female single skaters
Olympic figure skaters of Azerbaijan
Olympic figure skaters of the Unified Team
Figure skaters at the 1992 Winter Olympics
Figure skaters at the 1998 Winter Olympics
Figure skaters from Moscow
Living people
1974 births